Metropolis is a 32-to-48-page free monthly city guide, news and classified ads glossy magazine published by Japan Partnership Inc. targeting the English-speaking community in Tokyo, Japan. As of April 2011, its circulation was claimed to be 30,000.

History
The magazine was first published in 1994 as the Tokyo Classified. Early editions, in the broadsheet style, consisted of classified advertisements sourced from shop notice boards. Initially distributed with the Daily Yomiuri, the free magazine is now distributed across Tokyo and beyond to companies, embassies, hotels, bars and restaurants. The magazine was originally owned and operated by Mark and Mary Devlin, renamed Metropolis in 2001, and sold to Japan Inc. Holdings in 2007.

Since 1999 the magazine hosted an annual Halloween party "Glitterball" at Roppongi's Velfarre club at other notable clubs around Tokyo. Between 2003 and 2010, Metropolis donated some of the profits each year to the Make-A-Wish Foundation of Japan and the YMCA.

Metropolis is now owned by Japan Partnership Holdings Inc. From 2020, Metropolis became a quarterly magazine, mainly publishing its content online via its website and social media platforms.

References

External links
 

1994 establishments in Japan
City guides
Free magazines
Lifestyle magazines published in Japan
Listings magazines
Magazines established in 1994
Magazines published in Tokyo
Monthly magazines published in Japan
Tourism magazines
Local interest magazines